NKFC may refer to:

 Nong Khai F.C., a  football club based in Nong Khai, Thailand
 North Korea Freedom Coalition, an organisation for human rights in North Korea